George Silas Haddock (December 25, 1866 – April 18, 1926), nicknamed Gentleman George, was a 19th-century Major League Baseball pitcher. He played from 1888 to 1894 in the Players' League, American Association and National League. Haddock played right field for the Washington Nationals against the Cleveland Spiders, on September 4, 1889. He relieved George Keefe, who worked four innings as the Nationals' starting pitcher.

References

External links

Baseball Almanac

1866 births
1926 deaths
19th-century baseball players
Major League Baseball pitchers
Brooklyn Grooms players
Buffalo Bisons (PL) players
Philadelphia Phillies players
Washington Nationals (1886–1889) players
Washington Senators (1891–1899) players
Boston Reds (AA) players
Topeka Capitals players
Kansas City Cowboys (minor league) players
Emporia Reds players
Troy Trojans (minor league) players
Buffalo Bisons (minor league) players
Baseball players from New Hampshire
People from Portsmouth, New Hampshire
Sportspeople from Rockingham County, New Hampshire